A by-election was held for the New South Wales Legislative Assembly electorate of Hartley on 13 December 1947 because of the resignation of Hamilton Knight to accept an appointment as a Commissioner in the Commonwealth Industrial Commission.

Dates

Result

Hamilton Knight resigned to accept an appointment as a Commissioner in the Commonwealth Industrial Commission.

See also
Electoral results for the district of Hartley
List of New South Wales state by-elections

References

1947 elections in Australia
New South Wales state by-elections
1940s in New South Wales
December 1947 events in Australia